Pterygium inversum unguis or ventral pterygium is characterized by the adherence of the distal portion of the nailbed to the ventral surface of the nail plate.  The condition may be present at birth or acquired, and may cause pain with manipulation of small objects, typing, and close manicuring of the nail. secondary due to connective tissue disorders

See also
 Pterygium unguis
 Nail
 List of cutaneous conditions

References

Conditions of the skin appendages